Durk Pearson (born 1943 in Illinois) is a research scientist best known for coauthoring a series of books on longevity, beginning with Life Extension: A Practical Scientific Approach.

Early life 
While a student at the Massachusetts Institute of Technology, he was a member of the MIT Science Fiction Society and one of the writers for the early underground comic God Comics. Pearson graduated from MIT with a triple major in physics, biology, and psychology.

Career 
Pearson has patents in the area of oil shale and tar sands recovery, lasers, holography and supplement formulations. Pearson assisted with equipment design and experiments for NASA's Space Shuttle. Pearson is also an International Society for Testing and Failure Analysis honoree.

Publications
Pearson and Sandy Shaw are the authors of Life Extension: A Practical Scientific Approach (Warner Books, 1982), The Life Extension Companion (Warner Books), The Life Extension Weight Loss Program, and Freedom of Informed Choice: FDA v. Nutrient Supplements, (Common Sense Press, 1993).  He and Sandy Shaw have written numerous articles on life extension, cognitive enhancement, anti-aging, weight loss, and other aspects of nutrition.

Television, film, and video
Pearson and Shaw wrote, designed the stunts, and acted as technical advisors for a 1978 episode of The Wonderful World of Disney, called "Black Holes, Monsters That Eat Space and Time." They acted as scientific and technical advisors and received screen credits for the Clint Eastwood film Firefox. They received screen credits for acting as technical advisors for Douglas Trumbull's film Brainstorm, starring Natalie Wood. In 1988, Steve Sharon, Pearson, and Shaw wrote the thriller The Dead Pool, which was later sold to Warner Bros. and made into a Clint Eastwood Dirty Harry film.  Pearson and Shaw make a cameo appearance in the funeral scene. They are standing directly behind the bereaved.

Court case on dietary supplements
Pearson and Shaw in a civil action challenged the constitutional validity of several U.S. Food and Drug Administration ("FDA") regulations that require sellers of dietary supplements to obtain FDA authorization before labeling such supplements with "health claims." In ruling against the FDA, the U.S. Court of Appeals for the District of Columbia found that the supplement health claims were constitutionally protected free speech.

References

American health and wellness writers
Life extensionists
Living people
Massachusetts Institute of Technology School of Science alumni
1943 births